Luca Tabbiani (born 13 February 1979) is an Italian football coach, currently for Fiorenzuola in Serie C, and a former professional footballer.

Coaching career
On 5 November 2017 he was dismissed from Savona.

On 11 May 2018, he returned to Lavagnese in Serie D.

On 17 June 2019 he was hired by Serie D club Fiorenzuola. He was confirmed as Fiorenzuola manager after guiding them to promotion in the 2020–21 Serie D season.

Honours

Coach
Fiorenzuola
 Serie D: 2020–21 (Group D)

References

External links
Profile at lega-calcio.it

1979 births
Footballers from Genoa
Living people
Italian footballers
Association football midfielders
S.S.C. Bari players
Calcio Lecco 1912 players
Genoa C.F.C. players
Italian football managers